The classical Lie algebras are finite-dimensional Lie algebras over a field which can be classified into four types , ,  and , where for  the general linear Lie algebra and  the  identity matrix:

 , the special linear Lie algebra;
 , the odd-dimensional orthogonal Lie algebra;
 , the symplectic Lie algebra; and
 , the even-dimensional orthogonal Lie algebra.

The Moyal algebra is an infinite-dimensional Lie algebra that contains all classical Lie algebras as subalgebras.

See also
 Simple Lie algebra
 Classical group

References

Algebra
Lie algebras